This is a summary of 1942 in music in the United Kingdom.

Events
 January/February – Serge Koussevitzky commissions Benjamin Britten to compose an opera, Peter Grimes, one of the first commissions given by the Koussevitzky Music Foundation.
 16 March – Britten sails back to England with Peter Pears on board MS Axel Johnson.
 20 March – Vera Lynn records The White Cliffs of Dover with Mantovani at Decca Records's West Hampstead studio.
26 August – In an act of wartime cultural diplomacy, John Ireland, Granville Bantock, Arnold Bax and Benjamin Britten deliver a letter to the wife of the Soviet Ambassador sending greetings from British composers to their Soviet counterparts.
 November/December – E.J. Moeran's Symphony is the first British work to be recorded under the auspices of the British Council. The recording is made in Manchester by the Hallé Orchestra conducted by Leslie Heward.

Popular music
Vera Lynn with Mantovani – The White Cliffs of Dover (Walter Kent)

Classical music: new works
Kenneth J. Alford – Eagle Squadron
Benjamin Britten –
A Ceremony of Carols
Hymn to St Cecilia
 Gerald Finzi – Let Us Garlands Bring Op. 18, song cycle (words by Shakespeare)

Film and Incidental music
Noël Coward – In Which We Serve
Ralph Vaughan Williams – 
Coastal Command (film)
The Pilgrim’s Progress (music for radio production)
William Walton – The First of the Few directed by and starring Leslie Howard, with co-star David Niven.

Musical theatre
 22 October – Du Barry Was A Lady, London production opens at His Majesty's Theatre and runs for 178 performances
 19 November – Let's Face It!, London production opens at the Hippodrome and runs for 348 performances

Musical films
 Rose of Tralee, starring John Longden, Lesley Brook and Angela Glynne.
 We'll Smile Again, starring Bud Flanagan, Chesney Allen and Meinhart Maur.

Births
12 February – Lionel Grigson, English pianist, composer, and educator (died 1994)
15 February – Glyn Johns, recording engineer
19 February – Phil Coulter, musician and music producer
24 February – Tim Staffell, singer and guitarist 
28 February – Brian Jones, rock musician (The Rolling Stones) (died 1969)
9 March – John Cale, composer and musician
13 March – Meic Stevens, singer-songwriter
24 March – Arthur Brown, singer (Kingdom Come and The Crazy World of Arthur Brown)
19 April – David Fanshawe, composer (died 2010)
12 May – Ian Dury, singer-songwriter (died 2000)
18 June – Paul McCartney, singer, songwriter & composer
17 July – Spencer Davis, musician
13 August – Sheila Armstrong, soprano
21 September – Jill Gomez, soprano
27 September – Alvin Stardust (born Bernard Jewry, also called Shane Fenton), pop singer (died 2014)
31 December – Andy Summers, rock musician (Police)

Deaths
14 January – Harry Champion, music hall composer, 76
10 February – Felix Powell, musician, 63
17 May – Alfred Hollins, organist and composer, 76
12 June – Walter Leigh, composer, 36 (killed in action)
16 June – Haldane Stewart, organist, composer and choirmaster, 74
17 June – Jessie Bond, singer and actress in Gilbert & Sullivan, 89
30 July – Dorothy Silk, soprano, 59
15 October – Dame Marie Tempest, opera and musical comedy singer, 78
23 November – Peadar Kearney, Irish Republican and songwriter, writer of the lyrics to The Soldier's Song, 58

See also
 1942 in British television
 1942 in the United Kingdom
 List of British films of 1942

References

 
British music by year
1940s in British music